Dyadobacter endophyticus  is an endophytic, aerobic and rod-shaped bacterium from the genus of Dyadobacter which has been isolated from a maize root from Beijing in China.

References

External links 

Type strain of Dyadobacter endophyticus at BacDive -  the Bacterial Diversity Metadatabase

Cytophagia
Bacteria described in 2016